This is the list of cathedrals in Jamaica sorted by denomination.

Anglican
St. Jago de la Vega Cathedral, Spanish Town (Church in the Province of the West Indies)

Roman Catholic 
Cathedrals of the Roman Catholic Church in Jamaica:
Cathedral of the Most Blessed Sacrament, Montego Bay
Holy Trinity Cathedral, Kingston
St. Paul of the Cross Pro-Cathedral, Mandeville

See also
Lists of cathedrals

References

Cathedrals
Jamaica
Cathedrals